The Streptopoideae are a subfamily of monocotyledon perennial, herbaceous, mainly bulbous shade dwelling flowering plants in the lily family, Liliaceae. The subfamily includes three genera.

Description 
Seeds striate.

References 

Liliaceae
Monocot subfamilies